Four-time defending champion David Wagner defeated Itay Erenlib in the final, 6–4, 6–1 to win the quad wheelchair tennis title at the 2016 Wheelchair Tennis Masters. It was his ninth Masters singles title.

Seeds

  David Wagner (champion)
  Andrew Lapthorne (semifinals, third place)
  Itay Erenlib (final)
  Kim Kyu-seung (semifinals, fourth place)
  Shraga Weinberg (round robin)
  Antony Cotterill (round robin)

Draw

Finals

Group A

Group B

References

External links

Quad singles draw

Masters, 2016